La poupée (The Doll) is an opéra comique in a prelude and three acts composed by Edmond Audran with a libretto by Maurice Ordonneau. The libretto was based on E.T.A. Hoffmann's Der Sandmann, about a friar who falsely promises to marry his rich uncle's daughter to fool his uncle into giving money to the monastery; the scheme involves creating a doll that looks like the daughter. The uncle's daughter, however, turns the scheme on its head and fools the friar into marrying her by substituting herself for the doll.

Productions
The opera opened at the Théâtre de la Gaîté, Paris, on 21 October 1896. Along with Miss Helyett (1890), La poupée was one of Audran's late successes. It then played at the Prince of Wales Theatre in London, opening on 24 February 1897, with an English libretto in two acts by Arthur Sturgess, running for a very successful 576 performances. It starred Courtice Pounds and Willie Edouin, and Edna May later played in the piece.

On 11 September 1897, a single matinee performance of La Poupée at the Prince of Wales Theatre launched a British provincial tour with a new company. It also had a Broadway production in 1897 and was made into a film in 1920.

Roles

Synopsis

Maxime and his fellow monks are penniless and starving. A new member of the monastery, Lancelot, asks his rich uncle for aid. The uncle will assist the friars, but only if Lancelot gets married. The monks scheme to trick the uncle by using one of puppet master Hilarius's dolls, pretending that it is Lancelot's wife. Hilarius's newest puppet was made to look similar to Alesia, his daughter. At the wedding, however, Alesia masquerades as the doll, because she loves Lancelot. Lancelot does not discover that he has married the real Alesia until the wedding is over. Now he must leave the monastery with his wife, but the friars receive the generous sum of money from his uncle.

Musical numbers (from English-language adaptation)
Overture
Act I  -  Scene 1  -  The Monastery
No. 1 - Opening Chorus and Song - Lancelot - "Alas! with lean and empty scrip the Brotherhood are now returning..."
No. 1a - Exit of Chorus - "Yes, though we're poor in luck of late, and all our hearts are full of sorrow..."
No. 2 - Song - Father Maxime - "Soon you are to see life and much adventure..."
No. 3 - Bell Chorus, with Father Maxime and Lancelot - "Hark, how the bell is ringing, here we come with speed..."

Act I - Scene 2 -  Hilarius's Workshop
No. 4 - Workmen's Chorus - "We are workmen waiting for our payment; automatic dolls we make..."
No. 4a -*Exit of Chorus (reprise) - "We are workmen waiting for our payment..."
No. 5 - Song - Alesia - "With careless eye I saw him there, and love took rest within my heart..."
No. 6 - Song - Lancelot - "If in a cell your life is pass'd, nought of temptation you will see..."
No. 7 - Trio - Alesia, Lancelot and Hilarius - "I can dance and sing and chatter, though my speech is rather disjointed..."
No. 8 - Duet - Alesia and Lancelot - "I love you very dearly; my hand and heart at your feet I lay..."
No. 9 - Finale Act I - "Come, let us now to work, our task we never shirk..."

Act II - Scene 1  - Chanterelle's Country House
No. 9a - Entr'acte
No. 10 - Opening Chorus - "Now we appear, neighbours and friends; news that we hear, none can disparage..."
No. 11 - Duet - Chanterelle and Loremois - "This wicked world I've wander'd round, 'mid pleasant scenes and others not..."
No. 12 - Trio - Alesia, Chanterelle and Loremois - "Ah! Lancelot is not yet here; perhaps 'tis Chanterelle I see..."
No. 13 - Quartette - Chanterelle, Loremois, Lancelot and Hilarius - "Though manners change, a girl so strange..."
No. 14 - Duet - Lancelot and Alesia - "Happy world, such maidens possessing if like to thee..."
No. 15 - Ensemble - "Here are the wedding guests, who come to see the bridegroom and the blushing bride..."
No. 16 - Chorus - "After them we go! Follow them, stop them in their flight! Bring them back ere fall of night! ..."

Act II - Scene 2 -  Another part of the Monastery
No. 17 - Chorus - "'Tis night, and brother Lancelot has not returned from his adventure to keep the vow of his indenture..."
No. 18 - Song - Father Maxime - "A jovial monk am I, contented with my lot. The world without this gate I flout..."
No. 19 - Chorus of Monks - "Oh, strange device, so nearly true to life, 'tis worth the price he's paid for such a wife..."
No. 20 - Song - Alesia - "A poor little dummy am I, but still my intellect is shining..."
No. 21 - Exit of Monks - "Creature false and frail as that she's representing, not in strength we fail, not a whit we relent..."
No. 22 - Duet - Alesia and Lancelot - "Was it a kiss? Sweetest caress!  Token of bliss and happiness! ..."
No. 23 - Finale Act II - "And now I mean to leave this place, to start another kind of life..."

Supplementary numbers
No. 24 - Extra Song - Lancelot - "I went to town a simple youth as many more have done..."
No. 25 - Extra Song - Alesia - "'Tis the Springtime of love, with all its store of gladness..."

Adaptations
Ernst Lubitsch filmed an adaptation of the story under the title Die Puppe (The Doll).

Notes

References
Synopsis and information about La Poupée
Song list with links to cast list and other information

External links
List of longest running plays in London and New York
Programme from the original London production of La Poupée
Information about the 1897 New York production from the IBDB database

1897 musicals
French-language operas
Operas
Opéras comiques
1896 operas
Operas by Edmond Audran
Operas based on works by E. T. A. Hoffmann
Works based on The Sandman (short story)